The 1985 Wisconsin Badgers football team represented the University of Wisconsin–Madison in the 1985 Big Ten Conference football season.

Schedule

Roster

Game summaries

at Michigan

Iowa

at Ohio State

Team players in the 1986 NFL Draft

References

Wisconsin
Wisconsin Badgers football seasons
Wisconsin Badgers football